Fairfax Square is an upscale mixed-use development located directly south of Tysons Corner Center across Leesburg Pike in Tysons Corner, Virginia. It includes  of Class A office space, primarily occupied by financial tenants such as American Express, Merrill Lynch, and New York Life, and high-end ground-floor retail among its three identical high-rises. Fairfax Square was designed by Skidmore, Owings & Merrill. Its buildings are clad in Brazilian granite, and its lobbies are finished with Italian marble and wood paneling. Ground was broken for the development in 1988.

Hermès has its only Washington metropolitan area store in Fairfax Square and doubled its retail space after a reopening in 2006 due to store consistently outperforming the rest of the U.S. market. The Tiffany store in this location is twice as large as its newer counterpart on Wisconsin Avenue. Fendi opened its fourth store in the nation at Fairfax Square, but it has closed; Fendi has opened a boutique within Saks Fifth Avenue in Chevy Chase, Maryland. Fendi does, however, have a Fendi Casa showroom nearby in Washington. The Equinox fitness facility replaced an 8-screen movie theater, which closed in 2007, shortly after a 16-screen theater opened in Tyson's Corner Center.

The following stores are located in Fairfax Square:
Equinox Fitness & Spa
Hermès
Elizabeth Arden Red Door Salons
Tiffany & Co. 
Chef Geoff's

This location should not be confused with another older development, also named Fairfax Square, located in the City of Fairfax and consisting of a small amount of office and retail space.

See also
Tysons Galleria – an upscale shopping mall located directly north of Tysons Corner Center

References

External links
The Shops at Fairfax Square

Buildings and structures in Fairfax County, Virginia
Skidmore, Owings & Merrill buildings
Shopping malls in Virginia
Economy of Fairfax County, Virginia
Tourist attractions in Fairfax County, Virginia
Shopping malls established in 1990
1990 establishments in Virginia
Shopping malls in the Washington metropolitan area
Tysons, Virginia